Trans States Airlines was a regional airline owned by Trans States Holdings and headquartered in Bridgeton, Missouri. At the time of its closing, the airline operated flights for United Airlines under the United Express brand. Trans States Airlines ceased all operations on April 1, 2020.

History 
The company began operations as Resort Air in 1982. As an independent commuter air carrier, Resort Air operated Swearingen Metro propjets from a small hub located in St. Louis (STL) with service to Carbondale, Illinois; Columbia, Missouri; Fort Leonard Wood, MO; Joplin, MO; Lake of the Ozarks, MO; Springfield, IL; and Springfield, MO. In 1985, the company entered into an agreement with Trans World Airlines (TWA) to operate as Trans World Express serving six cities in Missouri and Illinois. In 1989 Resort Air changed its name to Trans States Airlines. Many new aircraft were added to replace the Swearingen Metro's including the British Aerospace Jetstream model 31 and model 41 as well as much larger ATR-42's and ATR-72's. New service was added to many more cities from St. Louis and in 1999, Embraer ERJ-145 regional jets were added for the Trans World Express system expanding service to several cities much further distant from St. Louis.

In 1993 TSA began operations on the west coast as USAir Express at Los Angeles (LAX) with service to Fresno, Monterey, Ontario, CA, Orange County, Palm Springs, San Diego, and Santa Barbara nonstop from LAX with British Aerospace BAe Jetstream 31 propjets. The operation continued until the year 2000. 

On the east coast, in 1995, TSA began operations as a code share feeder airline into New York City JFK Airport for both Trans World Express and United Express. By 1999, Trans States had begun operations as a Delta Connection code share air carrier for Delta Air Lines at New York JFK Airport with Embraer ERJ-145 regional jets and British Aerospace BAe Jetstream 41 propjets with nonstop service to Albany, NY, Baltimore, Greensboro, NC, Hartford/Springfield, Norfolk, VA, Philadelphia, Pittsburgh, Raleigh/Durham, Richmond, VA and Rochester, NY. Flights under the USAirways Express banner were also performed at Pittsburgh.

In December 2001, TWA merged into American Airlines and all Trans States flights operating as Trans World Express then began flying as American Connection. American later dismantled the St. Louis hub operation created by TWA and the American Connection flights ended in 2009. In 2015 American merged with US Airways and the US Airways Express flights operated by Trans States then began flying as American Eagle. These flights then ended in 2018.

In 2006 Trans States briefly operated a small hub at San Antonio, Texas flying Embraer ERJ-145s. The service was performed under the United Express banner with flights from San Antonio to Albuquerque, Colorado Springs, Kansas City, New Orleans, Oklahoma City, Omaha, and Tulsa.

The call sign "Waterski" and the ICAO 3-letter identifier "LOF," which stands for 'Lodge of the Four Seasons', are from the early days when the company was operated as Resort Air and took visitors to the Lake of the Ozarks in Missouri.

In 2015, the airline began a hub operation at Denver under the United Express banner and carried 3.6 million passengers for the year. 

In February 2020, Trans States announced their intent to gradually cease operations through 2020 and transfer their fleet of ERJ-145's to ExpressJet Airlines per an agreement with United Airlines. However, on March 17, 2020, CEO Rick Leach sent a memo to employees stating that due to the impact of the COVID-19 pandemic on aviation, the airline would cease operations on April 1, 2020, much earlier than originally expected. Compass Airlines, another regional airline owned by Trans States Holdings, also announced a cessation of operations effective April 7, 2020, leaving GoJet Airlines as the only operating airline owned by Trans States Holdings. The ERJ-145's that were transferred to ExpressJet were then transferred to CommutAir later in 2020 as ExpressJet was subsequently shut down. CommutAir is also a United Express operator. 

The final Trans States Airlines flight was United Express Flight 4695 from Springfield, Missouri to Denver, Colorado on April 1, 2020.

St. Louis TWA Express Hub Operations in 1990 

Trans States was operating 48-passenger ATR-42 and 19-passenger Fairchild Swearingen Metroliner (Metro III model) propjets in Trans World Express code share service for Trans World Airlines at this time from the TWA hub in St. Louis with nonstop flights to the following destinations:

 Burlington, IA
 Chicago, IL (Meigs Field) - one stop service via Springfield, IL
 Columbia, MO
 Des Moines, IA
 Joplin, MO
 Lincoln, NE
 Madison, WI
 Memphis, TN
 Moline, IL
 Peoria, IL
 Sioux City, IA
 Springfield, IL
 Springfield, MO

St. Louis TWA Express Hub Operations in 1995 

By 1995, Trans States had expanded its Trans World Express code sharing operations at the TWA St. Louis hub and was operating ATR-42, ATR-72, British Aerospace BAe Jetstream 31 and BAe Jetstream 41, and Embraer EMB-120 Brasilia turboprops with nonstop flights to the following destinations:

 Birmingham, AL
 Bloomington, IL
 Burlington, IA
 Cape Girardeau, MO
 Cedar Rapids, IA
 Champaign, IL
 Chicago, IL (Midway Airport)
 Columbia, MO
 Decatur, IL
 Des Moines, IA
 Evansville, IN
 Fayetteville, AR
 Fort Wayne, IN
 Grand Rapids, MI
 Joplin, MO
 Lexington, KY
 Knoxville, TN
 Madison, WI
 Marion, IL
 Memphis, TN
 Milwaukee, WI
 Moline, IL
 Paducah, KY
 Peoria, IL
 Quincy, IL
 Sioux City, IA
 South Bend, IN
 Springfield, IL
 Springfield, MO
 Waterloo, IA
 Chicago, IL (O'Hare)
 St Louis, MO
 Mexico City (Mexico)

United Express destinations
Prior to its shutdown, the airline operated to the following destinations under the United Express brand:

Fleet
Prior to its shutdown, the Trans States Airlines fleet consisted of the following aircraft:

Fleet development
In October 2009, Trans States Holdings announced an agreement to purchase 50 Mitsubishi MRJ90 with options for 50 more. Trans States Holdings held conversion rights to take the smaller, 76-seat MRJ70 instead of the 92-seat MRJ90 dependent on the scope clause environment by the time the airline took delivery. The order was cancelled as of October 2019 due to concerns that the Mitsubishi SpaceJet M90 aircraft violates the US Scope clause laws.

In April 2013, Trans States Airlines began taking delivery of six former Passaredo Linhas Aéreas ERJ-145s. In 2015 Trans States began parking their United Express ERJ-145ERs, in exchange for ERJ-145XRs transferred from ExpressJet.

Previously operated aircraft
Prior to becoming an all-jet airline, Trans States operated several different turboprop aircraft types including:

 ATR 42
 ATR 72
 BAe Jetstream 31 
 BAe Jetstream 41
 Embraer EMB-120 
 Fairchild Swearingen Metro III

These propjet aircraft were operated in code share feeder services for American Airlines, Delta Air Lines, Trans World Airlines (TWA), USAir and US Airways.

Accidents and incidents
July 14, 2004
Trans States Airlines Flight 3504, operated and marketed as a US Airways Express flight, overran the runway at Ottawa Macdonald–Cartier International Airport and sustained damage to the left inboard tire. There were no serious injuries. Transport Safety Board of Canada Accident Report
June 16, 2010
Trans States Airlines Flight 8050, operated and marketed as a United Express flight, overran the runway at Ottawa Macdonald–Cartier International Airport and sustained damage to the front of the aircraft with a nose gear collapse. Both pilots and one passenger sustained minor injuries.
 March 1, 2011 at 6:45 am EST
 A US Airways Embraer 145 operated by Trans States Airlines was being pushed back from the gate at Bradley International Airport for a departure to Pittsburgh when the front nose gear collapsed and the front of the plane dropped to the tarmac. None of the 29 passengers were injured.
September 4, 2011
Trans States Airlines Flight 3363 originating from Chicago IL, operated as a United Express flight, left the runway during landing at Ottawa Macdonald–Cartier International Airport. The aircraft, with 44 passengers on board, sustained damage to the main gear and belly, as well as to the right wing. There were no injuries to passengers or crew.
February 22, 2012
Trans States Airlines operating as United Express Flight 3350 originating from Chicago O'Hare, IL to Rochester, NY was on approach to land but overran the end of the runway by about 50–75 feet and came to a stop with all gear off the paved surface. There were no injuries. The passengers disembarked via mobile stairs and were bussed to the terminal.
August 7, 2018
A Trans States Airlines Embraer 145 operating as Flight 4697 from Washington Dulles to Providence, RI was forced to divert to John F. Kennedy International Airport after reports of smoke in the cabin. The aircraft was evacuated on the runway. Three of the 53 passengers received treatment at the scene.

See also 
 List of defunct airlines of the United States

References

External links 
 Trans States Airlines

Defunct airlines of the United States
Defunct regional airlines of the United States
Airlines established in 1982
Airlines disestablished in 2020
Regional Airline Association members
Companies based in St. Louis County, Missouri
Privately held companies based in Missouri
Former Oneworld affiliate members
1985 establishments in Missouri
2020 disestablishments in Missouri
American companies established in 1982
American companies disestablished in 2020